Rodentoleptis is a genus of tapeworms belonging to the family Hymenolepididae.

The genus has cosmopolitan distribution.

Species:

Rodentolepis akodontis 
Rodentolepis asymmetrica 
Rodentolepis avetjanea 
Rodentolepis erinacei 
Rodentolepis evaginata 
Rodentolepis fraterna 
Rodentolepis microstoma 
Rodentolepis myoxi 
Rodentolepis nana 
Rodentolepis octocoronata 
Rodentolepis straminea

References

Cestoda